Live is a 2002 live album by German heavy metal band Running Wild, released on 18 November. It was recorded live at Halle Gartlage in Osnabrück, Germany during their support tour for The Brotherhood.

Track listing

Personnel
 Rolf Kasparek - vocals, guitar
 Bernd Aufermann - guitar
 Peter Pichl - bass guitar
 Matthias Liebetruth - drums

Production
 Rolf Kasparek - Producer
 Rainer Holst - Mixing, Mastering

Charts

Running Wild (band) albums
2002 live albums